Common Ground may refer to:

Books and periodicals
 Common Ground (Lukas book), by J. Anthony Lukas
 Common Ground (magazine), a literary magazine published quarterly between 1941 and 1949
 Common Ground (memoir), by Canadian politician Justin Trudeau

Film
 Common Ground (1916 film), a silent film starring Marie Doro
 Common Ground (2000 film), a Showtime television movie
 Common Ground (2002 film), directed by Adolfo Aristarain

Music
 Common Ground, by Tom Chapin, 2001
 Common Ground, by Mazgani, 2013
 Common Ground, by Kathryn Tickell, 1988
 Common Ground (Above & Beyond album), or the title song, 2018
 Common Ground (Gary Burton album), or the title song, 2011
 Common Ground (EP), or the title song, by Andy McKee, 2009
 Common Ground (Richie Havens album), 1983
 Common Ground (Leama & Moor album), 2006
 Common Ground (Rhythm Corps album), or the title song, 1988
 Common Ground (Paul Winter album), or the title song, 1978
 The Common Ground, by Herbie Mann, or the title instrumental, 1960
 "Common Ground (Get It Goin' On)", a song by A Tribe Called Quest from The Love Movement
 Common Ground: Dave & Phil Alvin Play and Sing the Songs of Big Bill Broonzy, by Dave and Phil Alvin, 2014
 Common Ground (Big Big Train album), or the title song, 2021

Organizations
 Common Ground (New York City), a non-profit supportive housing provider
 Common Ground (Seattle), a Seattle-based nonprofit affordable housing developer
 Common Ground (United Kingdom), promoting local distinctiveness
 Common Ground Collective, a network of volunteer organizations supporting New Orleans
 Common Ground Festival, an underground punk festival in the UK
 Common Ground Health Clinic, a non-profit, free clinic in New Orleans
 Common Ground Music Festival, an event held annually in Lansing, Michigan, U.S.
 Common Ground Project, a Buddhist-Muslim interfaith initiative

Other uses
Common Ground (British TV series), a Sky News programme (2022–present)
 Common ground (communication technique)
 Common ground (linguistics) a set of propositions mutually agreed on by interlocutors
 CommonGround (software)

See also
 Common Grounds, a comic book series